Howell Appling Jr. (September 5, 1919 – October 16, 2002) was an American Republican politician and businessman in Oregon, U.S.

Biography
Appling was born in 1919 in Carthage, Texas. His father was Howell Appling Sr. He received a degree in engineering from Rice University in 1941 before joining the U.S. Navy during World War II, where he rose to the rank of lieutenant. In 1946, after completing his military service, Appling founded Independent Distributors, a Portland wholesale logging and farm equipment firm.

Appling served as the Multnomah County chairman of Mark Hatfield's successful 1958 bid for governor. After the election, Appling was appointed Secretary of State by Hatfield, who preceded him in that office.

Appling was elected to a full term in 1960 (defeating Monroe Sweetland), but declined to seek re-election in 1964. He was succeeded by Tom McCall in January 1965.

Appling served as the Oregon chairman of the Oregon presidential campaigns of Barry Goldwater in 1964, and Richard Nixon in 1968.

He continued as a prominent Portland businessman until his death on October 16, 2002.

External links
Secretary of State Agency History, page 16 from the Oregon Blue Book
Entry from the Political Graveyard

Archived Obituary

1919 births
2002 deaths
Secretaries of State of Oregon
United States Navy personnel of World War II
Portland, Oregon Republicans
Rice University alumni
United States Navy officers
Businesspeople from Portland, Oregon
20th-century American politicians
20th-century American businesspeople